Bait Gali is one of the 44 union councils of Haripur District in the Khyber Pakhtunkhwa Province of Pakistan.

Formerly, it was a part of Princely State of Amb.

References

Union councils of Haripur District